Philippe Couvreur, (born 29 November 1951 in Schaerbeek, Belgium), is a jurist specialized in international law. He served as the Registrar of the International Court of Justice in The Hague (The Netherlands) from 2000 to 2019.

Education 
After a classical education at the Collège Jean XXIII in Brussels, Philippe Couvreur studied law at Notre-Dame de la Paix University in Namur and at the Université catholique de Louvain, and international and European law at King's College London, at the Complutense University of Madrid and at the Université catholique de Louvain. He also studied Thomist philosophy in this latter university. Philippe Couvreur speaks five languages (French, Dutch, English, Spanish and Italian).

Professional career 
After working in the legal department of the European Commission, Couvreur held several legal positions at the International Court of Justice successively (since 1982), including the position of Principal Legal Secretary (Head of the Legal Department).

He served as the Registrar of the International Court of Justice from February 2000 and was re-elected twice.

He retired on 1 July 2019.

Academic career 
Couvreur has taught European and international law in numerous universities and academies, in the capacity of:

 from 1976 to 1982, Assistant Professor at the European Studies Centre and the Law Faculty of the Université catholique de Louvain;
 from 1980 to 1982, Visiting Professor in the law of international organizations at the Law Faculty of the University of Ouagadougou (Burkina Faso);
 from 1986 to 1996, Professor in the law of nations and comparative constitutional law at HEC Saint Louis (Brussels);
 from 1997 to 2017, Guest lecturer at the Law Faculty of the Université catholique de Louvain (co-lecturer in courses on the advanced law of nations and current issues in public international law).

He has also been a speaker at numerous colloquiums, conferences and seminars.

Philippe Couvreur is also a Corresponding Member of the Spanish Royal Academy of Moral and Political Sciences, as well as a member of various other learned societies. He holds various decorations, including notably Commander by Number of the Orden de Isabel la Católica (Spain) and of the Orden del Mérito civil (Spain), Officer of the Légion d'honneur (France), as well as Grand Officer in the Order of Leopold (Belgium).

Lectures
 Le déroulement du procès devant la Cour internationale de Justice in the Lecture Series of the United Nations Audiovisual Library of International Law
 La Cour internationale de Justice: Un entretien avec M. Philippe Couvreur, Greffier de la Cour internationale de Justice in the Lecture Series of the United Nations Audiovisual Library of International Law (retrieved 2013-03-26)
 La Cour permanente de Justice Internationale: Un entretien avec M. Philippe Couvreur, Greffier de la Cour internationale de Justice in the Lecture Series of the United Nations Audiovisual Library of International Law (retrieved 2013-03-26)
 Réunion d'information au Palais de la Paix à l'intention des membres du corps diplomatique in the Lecture Series of the United Nations Audiovisual Library of International Law (retrieved 2013-03-26)

Main publications 

 La problématique de l’adhésion de l’Espagne aux Communautés européennes, with E. Cerexhe, Centre d’Etudes Européennes of the Université catholique de Louvain, June 1978.
 "L’épuisement des voies de recours internes et la Cour européenne des droits de l’homme : l’arrêt Van Oosterwijck du 6 novembre 1980", Revue belge de droit international, Vol. XVI, 1981, pp. 130–171.
 "Les Etats fédéraux dans les relations internationales : les organisations internationals", Revue belge de droit international, Vol. XVII, 1983, p. 189–227.
 "A propos de l’effectivité de la Cour internationale de Justice dans le règlement pacifique des différends internationaux", African Yearbook of International Law, 1996, Vol. 4, pp. 103–134.
 "The Effectiveness of the International Court of Justice in the Peaceful Settlement of International Disputes", in The International Court of Justice: its Future Role after Fifty Years, A.S. Muller et al. (eds), The Hague, Martinus Nijhof, 1997, pp. 83–116.
 "Développements récents concernant l’accès des organisations intergouvernementales à la procédure contentieuse devant la Cour internationale de Justice", in Liber amicorum Mohammed Bedjaoui, The Hague, Kluwer Law International, 1999, pp. 293–323.
 "La contribution du Professeur Charles De Visscher à la justice internationale", European Journal of International Law, 1999, pp. 905–938.
 "Le Greffier de la Cour internationale de Justice : statut et fonctions", Global Community: Yearbook of International Law and Jurisprudence, 2003, Vol. I, pp. 19–78.
 "The Registrar of the International Court of Justice: Status and Functioning", in The Legal Practice in International Law and European Community Law, Carlos Jiménez Piernas (ed.), Martinez Sijthof, 2007.
 "La jurisprudencia de la Corte Internacional de Justicia en materia de Derechos Humanos", in La eficacia del Derecho Internacional de los Derechos Humanos, Cursos de Derechos Humanos de Donostia-San Sebastian, Vol. XI, Juan Soroeta Liceras (ed.), Servicio editorial de la Universidad del País Vasco, 2011, pp. 123–147. 
 "Notes sur le 'droit' colonial français dans la mise en œuvre du principe de l'uti possidetis juris par la Cour internationale de Justice", in L’Afrique et le droit international : Variations sur l’Organisation internationale / Africa and International Law : Reflections on the International Organization – Liber Amicorum Raymond Ranjeva, Maurice K. Kamga and Makane Moïse Mbengue (eds.), Paris, Pedone, 2013, pp. 111–124.
 "Regards sur la Cour permanente de Justice internationale", in The Global Community: Yearbook of International Law and Jurisprudence, Global Trends: Law, Policy & Justice Essays in Honour of Professor Giuliana Ziccardi Capaldo, Mahmoud Cherif Bassiouni et al. (eds.), New York, Oxford University Press USA, 2013, pp. 101–115.
 "Notes sur la Cour internationale de justice et la volonté des États", in Les limites du droit international : Essais en l’honneur de Joe Verhoeven, Pierre d’Argent, Béatrice Bonafé, Jean Combacau, (coord.), Bruylant, Brussels, 2015, pp. 423–447.
 "The International Court of Justice", in The Contribution of International and Supranational Courts to the Rule of Law, Geert De Bare, Jan Wouters, (eds.), Leuven Centre for Global Governance Studies, Elgar Publishing, 2015, pp. 85–126. 
 "La Ville libre de Dantzig devant la Cour permanente de Justice Internationale", in Contemporary Developments in International Law: Essays in Honour of Budislav Vukas, Rüdiger Wolfrum et al. (eds.), Brill/Nijhoff, Leiden/Boston, 2016, pp. 3–25.
 "Privileges and Immunities of Members of the International Court of Justice, the Registrar and Officials of the Registry, and Other Persons Connected with the Business of the Court", in The Conventions on the Privileges and Immunities of the United Nations and its Specialized Agencies. A Commentary, August Reinisch (ed.), Oxford University Press, 2016, pp. 859–871.
 "Le 'droit colonial' dans le contentieux frontalier terrestre, à la lumière de la jurisprudence récente de la CIJ", in Droit des frontières internationales, Pierre d’Argent, Evelyne Lagrange, Stefan Oeter, (dir.), Pedone, Paris, 2016, pp. 127–144.
 "L’œuvre de la CIJ à la veille de son 70e anniversaire. Son rôle dans la réalisation des buts et principes des Nations Unies", Romanian Journal of International Law, vol. 17 (2017), pp. 8–25.
 The International Court of Justice and the Effectiveness of International Law, Collected Courses of the Xiamen Academy of International Law, vol. 9, Brill/Martinus Nijhoff, Leiden, 2016, 271 p.
 "Estoppel: synonyme pédant de la bonne foi", in Dictionnaire des idées reçues du droit international, Pedone, Paris, 2017, pp. 221–228.
 "70 Years of the International Court of Justice : How Does It Remain Relevant in a Changing World?", Sophia Law Review, vol. 61 (2017), pp. 1–15. 
"Evidence before the International Court of Justice", in R. Kolodkin (ed.), Evidence before International Courts and Tribunals: Distinct Fora, Similar Approaches?, International and Comparative Law Research Center, Moscou, 20.

References

External links
 UN Biography, Philippe Couvreur

1951 births
Living people
Alumni of King's College London
20th-century Belgian lawyers
International Court of Justice judges
Members of the Institut de Droit International
21st-century Belgian judges